Killbilly Hill is the second studio album by American country music group Southern Pacific. It was released in 1986 via Warner Bros. Records. The album includes the singles "A Girl Like Emmylou", "Killbilly Hill" and "Don't Let Go of My Heart".

Track listing

Chart performance

References

1986 albums
Southern Pacific (band) albums
Albums produced by Jim Ed Norman
Warner Records albums